"All Night to Figure It Out" is a song recorded by Canadian country artist Jade Eagleson. The song was written by Ben Stennis, Brad Rempel, and Jeremy Spillman. It was the lead single off Eagleson's second studio album Honkytonk Revival.

Background
Fellow Canadian country artist Brad Rempel of High Valley co-wrote the song, and sent it to Eagleson, who said he knew he wanted to record it as soon as he heard it. Eagleson said the song caused him to "venture outside my vocal comfort zone" and that producer Todd Clark helped him push his ability past what he believed he was capable of.

Critical reception
Jenna Weishar of Front Porch Music said the song is "flirty" and "fun", adding that it "very easily gets stuck in your head". Nanci Dagg of Canadian Beats Media called it a "bold track that marks a new direction for Eagleson". Matthew Weaver of Corus Radio referred to the track as "a banger".

Accolades

Commercial performance
"All Night to Figure It Out"  reached a peak of Number One on the Billboard Canada Country chart for the week of July 3, 2021, becoming Eagleson's second career chart-topper after "Lucky". It peaked at number 67 on the Canadian Hot 100 in the same week, marking a new highest charting entry for Eagleson there. It has been certified Gold by Music Canada.

Music video
The official music video for "All Night to Figure It Out" was directed by Ben Knechtel and premiered on ET Canada on March 17, 2021. It features several men learning how to choreograph a dance, and then performing it for their unsuspecting wives.

Charts

Certifications

References

2021 songs
2021 singles
Jade Eagleson songs
Songs written by Ben Stennis
Songs written by Brad Rempel
Songs written by Jeremy Spillman
Song recordings produced by Todd Clark